This is a list of the 56 members of the House of Representatives of Cyprus, following the 2011 legislative election.

List of elected members 2011

List of observers

Sources
Biographical notes – Parliament of Cyprus

Politics of Cyprus
Lists of members of the House of Representatives (Cyprus)